Volpedo is a comune (municipality) in the Province of Alessandria in the Italian region Piedmont, located about  east of Turin and about  east of Alessandria.

Volpedo borders the following municipalities: Casalnoceto, Godiasco, Monleale, Montemarzino, Pozzol Groppo, and Volpeglino.

Painter Giuseppe Pellizza da Volpedo was born in this village.

History
A burial slab, now enclosed in the parish church's walls, shows the Roman presence in the area in the 1st century BC, although the area was perhaps already inhabited by the Ligures.

In the 10th century it is documented as Vicus Piculus (from latin vicus: "Small village") and received a Romanesque pieve and a castrum, a fortified village whose walls, rebuilt in the 16th century, are still visible today. In the 12th century it was known as Vicus pecudis, and was connected to the comune of Tortona, sending relief troops to that city during the siege laid by Frederick Barbarossa in 1155.

In 1347 Tortona was annexed by the Visconti of Milan who, in 1412, gave Volpedo as a fief to the condottiero Pierino Cameri. The latter ceded the town to the Cathedral of Milan. In 1513 the walls of Volpedo, of Guelph allegiance, were destroyed by the historical Ghibelline rival town of Monleale on the opposite side of the river Curone; the walls were rebuilt in 1589, when Milan was under Spanish domination.

In 1738 Volpedo, together with all the area of Tortona, was acquired by the Kingdom of Sardinia (Piedmont), and was given as a fief to marquis Filippo Guidobono Cavalchini. In 1849 it became a possession of the Malaspina.

In the XIX century part of the walls were progressively abducted and in 1856 the Curone bridge, linking Volpedo with Monleale, was built. Only in 1885 a direct route to Tortona, passing through Monleale, was built.

Between 1928 and 1947, the communes of Berzano, Monleale and Volpeglino were merged into that of Volpedo.

Main sights
Romanesque pieve (pleban church), known since the 10th century and restored in the late 15th century. It houses frescoes from the 15th century from the brothers Manfredino and Franceschino Basilio, also active in the Milan's Duomo.
16th century bastions which once enclosed the medieval castrum, and now mark the historical center of Volpedo.
House-studio of the painter Pellizza da Volpedo

References

Cities and towns in Piedmont